Princesa was a 70-gun, two deck, ship of the line of the Spanish Navy, launched in 1750.

She fought at the Battle of Cape St Vincent in 1780, where she was captured by Admiral George Rodney of the Royal Navy. She was then recommissioned in England as the third rate HMS Princessa.

On 12 April 1782 she was the flagship of the blue squadron at the Battle of the Saintes with Admiral Francis Samuel Drake on board (but under overall control of Admiral George Rodney of the white squadron.

From 1784 she was employed as a sheer hulk, and she was broken up in 1809.

Notes

References

 Lavery, Brian (2003) The Ship of the Line – Volume 1: The development of the battlefleet 1650–1850. Conway Maritime Press. .

Princesa (1750)
Ships of the line of the Royal Navy
1750 ships